The 1965 Blue Swords was an international senior-level figure skating competition organized in Karl-Marx-Stadt, East Germany. Medals were awarded in the disciplines of men's singles, ladies' singles, pair skating and ice dancing. East German national champions Ralph Borghard and Gabriele Seyfert each won their third Blue Swords title, with Borghard defeating France's Robert Dureville and Seyfert defeating her teammate Beate Richter. In the pairs' category, Heidemarie Steiner / Heinz-Ulrich Walther won the first of their three consecutive gold medals at the event.

Results

Men

Ladies

Pairs

Ice dancing 

Blue Swords
Blue Swords